CBD-FM is a Canadian radio station broadcasting at 91.3 MHz from Saint John, New Brunswick and is the local Radio One station of the Canadian Broadcasting Corporation.

History

CBD was launched on October 15, 1964 at 1110 AM. Prior to its launch, CBC Radio programming was aired on private affiliate CHSJ. A simulcast on 91.3 FM began on May 13, 1981 before the AM transmitter was shut down in September 1988.

Local programming
CBD-FM currently produces the news and current-affairs program, Information Morning Saint John.

Notable Staff

Current
 Julia Wright - Host of Information Morning Saint John
Sarah Trainor - Morning news reader, CBC News
Cindy Grant - Technical Director
Megan MacAlpine - Associate Producer, Information Morning
 Steven Webb - Producer/Editor, CBC News
 Rachel Cave - CBC News
Colin McPhail - CBC News
 Robert Jones - CBC News
 Connell Smith - CBC News
 Bobbi-Jean MacKinnon - CBC News
 Peter Anawati - CBC News
 Grahame Thompson - CBC News
 Roger Cosman - CBC News

Former
 Eleanor Austin, CBC Radio 1982–96; Producer of Rolling Home Show & Mainstreet, Writer-Broadcaster on Information Morning 
 Nancy Watson, Producer of Rolling Home Show 
 Susan Lambert, Information Morning Producer, Executive Producer
 Sandy Lumsden, Founding Executive Producer of CBD 
 Roy Geldart, newsreader for/co-host of Information Morning (now retired)
 Hance Colburne, former host of Information Morning
 Costas Halavrezos, former host of The Rolling Home Show
 Jeff Collins, former host with above, then host at CBC Calgary (now retired)
 Stan Carew (went on to host of Weekend Mornings, produced at CBHA-FM Halifax, died on July 6, 2015)
 Brent Bambury (currently host of Day 6 on CBC Radio One)
 Harvey MacLeod, producer of MainStreet and The Rolling Home Show (now retired)
 Gary Mittelholtz, reporter/host of MainStreet and The Rolling Home Show (died on March 15, 2010)
 Jo-Ann Roberts, host/reporter (now at CBCV-FM Victoria)
 Christiane Vianncourt, host of Information Morning (now with Rogers Cable)
 Paul Castle, former host of Information Morning and Mainstreet/Shift

Rebroadcasters

On June 11, 2013, the CBC submitted an application to the CRTC to convert CBAO 990 to 88.1 FM; this application was approved on November 6, 2013. On July 3, 2014, the CBC received approval from the CRTC to change CBD-FM-1's frequency to 106.3.

References

External links
CBC New Brunswick
 

BD
BD
Radio stations established in 1964
1964 establishments in New Brunswick